Cumberland is a historic county in far North West England. It covers part of the Lake District as well as the north Pennines and Solway Firth coast. Cumberland had an administrative function from the 12th century until 1974, when it was subsumed into Cumbria, a larger administrative area which also covered Westmorland and parts of Yorkshire and Lancashire. In April 2023, Cumberland will be revived as an administrative entity when Cumbria County Council is abolished and replaced by two unitary authorities; one of these is to be named Cumberland and will include most of the historic county, with the exception of Penrith and the surrounding area.

Cumberland is bordered by the historic counties of Northumberland to the north-east, County Durham to the east, Westmorland to the south-east, Lancashire to the south, and the Scottish counties of Dumfriesshire and Roxburghshire to the north.

Early history 
In the Early Middle Ages, Cumbria was part of the Kingdom of Strathclyde in the Hen Ogledd, or "Old North", and its people spoke a Brittonic language now called Cumbric. The first record of the term 'Cumberland' appears in AD 945, when the Anglo-Saxon Chronicle recorded that the area was ceded to Malcolm I, king of Alba (Scotland), by King Edmund I of England.

At the time of the Domesday Book (AD 1086) most of the future county was part of Scotland, although some villages around Millom, which were the possessions of the Earl of Northumbria, had been incorporated into Yorkshire.

In AD 1092, King William Rufus of England invaded the Carlisle district, settling it with colonists. He created an Earldom of Carlisle, and granted the territory to Ranulf le Meschin. In 1133, Carlisle was made the see of a new diocese, largely identical with the area of the earldom. However, on the death of King Henry I of England in 1135, the area was regained by King David I of Scotland. He was able to consolidate his power and made Carlisle one of his chief seats of government, while England descended into a lengthy civil war. The Cumbric language is believed to have become extinct in the 12th century. 

The area returned to the English crown in 1157, when Henry II of England took possession of the area (from Malcolm IV of Scotland). Henry II formed two new counties from the former earldom: Westmorland and Carliol – originally an abbreviation of the Latin  '[bishop] of Carlisle'. Westmorland also included areas formerly part of the Earldom of Lancaster. The lead- and silver-mining area of Alston, previously associated with the Liberty of Tynedale was later also added to the new county of Carliol for financial reasons. By 1177, Carliol had become known as Cumberland. The border between England and Scotland was made permanent by the Treaty of York in 1237.

Geography
The boundaries formed in the 12th century were not changed substantially over the county's existence. There are four English historic counties and two Scottish counties that it borders: Northumberland and County Durham to the east; Westmorland to the south, the Furness part of Lancashire to the southwest; Dumfriesshire to the north and Roxburghshire to the northeast.

To the west the county is bounded by the Solway Firth and the Irish Sea. The northern boundary was formed by the Solway Estuary and the border with Scotland running east to Scotch Knowe at Kershope Burn. The boundary runs south from Scotch Knowe along the Cheviot Hills, then followed a tributary of the River Irthing and crossed Denton Fell to the River Tees. From Tees Head the boundary crosses the Pennines to descend Crowdundale Beck, from where it followed the rivers Eden and Eamont to the centre of Ullswater. The line follows Glencoin Beck to the top of Helvellyn ridge at Wrynose Pass and along the River Duddon (near Millom) to the sea .

Carlisle is the county town.

Sub-divisions

The Earldom of Carlisle was partitioned into baronies. When the County of Cumberland was created, the baronies were subdivided as wards, a county sub-division also used in Durham, Northumberland and Westmorland. These originated as military subdivisions used to organise the male inhabitants for the county's defence from Scottish troop incursions. 

Each ward was composed of a number of parishes, areas originally formed for ecclesiastical administration. In common with other northern England counties, many ancient parishes in Cumberland were very large, often consisting of a number of distinct townships and hamlets. Many of these ancient parishes eventually became civil parishes and form the lowest level of local government.

Allerdale above Derwent

Allerdale below Derwent

Eskdale

Leath

Cumberland Ward
Cumberland Ward included Carlisle and Wigton as well as parts of Inglewood Forest. The parish of Stanwix just to the north of Carlisle was partly in both Eskdale and Cumberland wards.

* Parts or all of these parishes and townships constituted the City of Carlisle, and were largely outside the jurisdiction of Cumberland Ward.

Local government from the 19th century
During the 19th century a series of reforms reshaped the local government of the county, creating a system of districts with directly elected councils.

Poor law and municipal reform

The first changes concerned the administration of the poor law, which was carried at parish level. The Poor Law Amendment Act 1834 provided for the grouping of parishes into poor law unions, each with a central workhouse and an elected board of guardians. Cumberland was divided into nine unions: Alston with Garrigill, Bootle, Brampton, Carlisle, Cockermouth, Longtown, Penrith, Whitehaven and Wigton.

In the following year the Municipal Corporations Act 1835 was passed, reforming boroughs and cities in England and Wales as municipal boroughs with a uniform constitution. The corporation of the City of Carlisle was accordingly remodelled with a popularly elected council consisting of a mayor, aldermen and councillors.

Local boards and sanitary districts

Outside of municipal boroughs, there was no effective local government until the 1840s. In response to poor sanitary conditions and outbreaks of cholera, the Public Health Act 1848 and the Local Government Act 1858 allowed for the formation of local boards of health in populous areas. Local boards were responsible inter alia for water supply, drainage, sewerage, paving and cleansing. Eleven local boards were initially formed at Brampton, Cleator Moor, Cockermouth, Egremont, Holme Cultram, Keswick, Maryport, Millom, Penrith, Whitehaven, Wigton and Workington.

Further reform under the Public Health Act 1875 saw the creation of sanitary districts throughout England and Wales. The existing municipal boroughs and local boards became "urban sanitary districts", while "rural sanitary districts" were formed from the remaining areas of the poor law unions.

Three more local boards were formed: Arlecdon and Frizington in 1882, Harrington in 1891 and Aspatria in 1892. In addition Workington and Whitehaven received charters of incorporation to become municipal boroughs in 1883 and 1894 respectively.

Local government acts of 1888 and 1894

In 1889, under the Local Government Act 1888, the Cumberland County Council was created as the county council for Cumberland, taking over administrative functions from the Court of Quarter Sessions. The Local Government Act 1894 reconstituted the existing sanitary districts as urban districts and rural districts, each with an elected council.

The Act of 1888 also allowed any municipal borough with a population of 50,000 people or more to become a "county borough", independent of county council control. In 1914, Carlisle successfully applied for this status, ceasing to form part of the administrative county, although remaining within Cumberland for the purposes such as Lieutenancy and shrievalty.

Reform in 1934

The Local Government Act 1929 imposed the duty on county councils of reviewing the districts within their administrative county so as to form more efficient units of local government. In general, this meant the merging of small or lightly populated areas into larger units. A review was carried in Cumberland in 1934. The following table lists the urban and rural districts before and after the changes.

The distribution of population in 1971 was as follows:1971 Census; Small Area Statistics

In 1974, under the Local Government Act 1972, the administrative county and county borough were abolished and their former area was combined with Westmorland and parts of Lancashire and the West Riding of Yorkshire to form the new county of Cumbria. The area from Cumberland went on to form the districts of Carlisle, Allerdale, Copeland and part of Eden.

Legacy
The name continues in use as a geographical and cultural term, and it survives in Cumberland sausages; HMS Cumberland; the Cumberland Fell Runners Club; the Cumberland Athletics Club; and various organisations and companies, such as the local newspapers The Cumberland News, and The West Cumberland Times and Star, and the Cumberland Building Society. It is also mentioned in Macbeth as the kingdom given to Prince Malcolm.

In June 1994, during the 1990s UK local government reform, the Local Government Commission published draft recommendations, suggesting as one option a North Cumbria unitary authority (also including Appleby, the historic county town of Westmorland).  It also suggested that Cumberland could be reinstated as an independent ceremonial county.  The final recommendations, published in October 1994, did not include such recommendations, apparently due to lack of expression of support for the proposal to the commission.

The Grass-of-Parnassus was the county flower. It had been associated with the county since 1951, when it was included in the coat of arms granted to the Cumberland County Council. It subsequently featured in the arms granted to Cumbria County Council and Copeland Borough Council, in both cases to represent Cumberland. The flower was also attributed to Cumbria in 2002 as part of a national County flowers of the United Kingdom campaign by the charity Plantlife. 
In 2012, a flag based on the arms of the former Cumberland County Council was registered as the flag of Cumberland with the Flag Institute. 

In 2013, the Secretary of State for Communities and Local Government, Eric Pickles, formally recognised and acknowledged the continued existence of England's 39 historic counties, including Cumberland.

In 2021, it was announced that in April 2023 local government in Cumbria will be reorganised into two unitary authorities, one of which is to be named Cumberland and would include most of the historic county, with the exception of Penrith and the surrounding area.

See also

 List of Lord Lieutenants for Cumberland
 List of High Sheriffs for Cumberland
 Custos Rotulorum of Cumberland - Keepers of the Rolls
 List of MPs for Cumberland constituency
 Broughan (Cumberland surname)

References

Further reading 
 Cumberland Heritage by Molly Lefebure (Chapters include Camden, Briathwaite, Millbeck, Fellwalkers, Carlisle Canal, Armboth, John Peel (farmer) and the Blencathra), with endpaper maps of old Cumberland.Detail taken from a copy of Cumberland Heritage published by Victor Gollancz, London in 1970,

External links
Cumberland, England – History and Description, 1868
Map of Cumberland on Wikishire

Counties of England established in antiquity
Counties of England disestablished in 1974
Former counties of England 
History of Cumbria